WSFM-LP, known as 103.3 Asheville FM, is a low-power radio station licensed to Asheville, North Carolina that began broadcasting over the air on May 18, 2015.

About
Asheville FM is a nonprofit, freeform radio station run primarily by volunteers and focused on featuring locally created content that is reflective of and centered around the Asheville area and western North Carolina in general. The station currently has 60 shows, all hosted by locals, in addition to Democracy Now!

Except for a general manager and one employee who works on commission to sell underwriting, the station is programmed entirely by volunteers. The station gets its funding from underwriting, fund-raising twice a year, and donations from the public.

Programming
Asheville FM offers a variety of programming, including music shows, talk shows (including a local news show), and two Spanish-language shows.

Musical genres represented on the station's music shows include rock, soul, R&B, funk, disco, progressive rock, classic country, hip hop, blues, and children's music.

Talk shows topics include health, local news, the local food scene, and sports.

Due to the station's freeform programming, there are programs that mix talk and music.

History
Asheville FM began in 2009 as an online radio station. The passage of the Low-Power Community Radio Act of 2010 provided Asheville FM an opportunity to move to a broadcast frequency. From a 20-foot tower on top of the Hotel Indigo in downtown Asheville, Asheville FM's signal reaches a 5- to 10-mile radius but terrain affects exactly where the signal can be heard.

The station's current – and first – general manager is K.P. Whaley, who began in January 2017.

See also
List of community radio stations in the United States

References

External links
Station website

SFM
Community radio stations in the United States
Radio stations established in 2015
2015 establishments in North Carolina